Sandar  (22 March 1949 – 23 December 2006) was a Burmese actress. She won the Myanmar Academy Award for Best Actress in 1967 with the film Nhaitmwa Athel.

Early life
Sanda was born on March 22, 1949 in Rangoon, Burma to parents Mya Maung and Marla Myint. Her birth name is San San Shin (စန်းစန်းရှင်). She is the fourth oldest of her siblings. Her siblings are Khin Oo Maw, Win Mar, Toe Nyunt, Sanda and Mya Zaw (Fuji). They are also works in film industry.

Career 
While Sanda was studying at Basic Education High School No. 2 Sanchaung she would star in a number of films as a child actor with her staged named Sanda. She gained recognition by playing as the young version of Win Mar in films such as 1953's Yadanarbon (ရတနာပုံ) and in 1995's Pho Pyone Cho (ဖိုးပြုံးချို). She became popular and has starred in many other famous films such as Akyaw Amaw (အကျော်အမော်), Naung Thitsar (နှောင်းသစ္စာ), Swetae Metta (စွဲတဲ့ မေတ္တာ), Metta Shwe Yi (မေတ္တာရွှေရည်) and Min Htin Shwe Hmone (မင်းထင်ရွှေမှန်).

In 1967, she starred in two separate roles in director Tin Maung's film Nhaitmwa Athel (နှစ်မွှာအသည်း) winning her the Myanmar Academy Award for Best Actress in 1967. The film also won the best director award as well as the photography award. In the film, Sanda plays the role of a boy with short hair, which influentienced many young girls to cut their hairs short. The hairstyle was dubbed as the Sanda hair.

In the romance film Metta, she co-starred with actor Kyaw Hein. She married him later on. She acted in many films such as Tahkyethkote Nhaithkyet Pyat, Phusar Lansone and Aywe Yine. After her troubled marriage, she divorced with Kyaw Hein. After that, she disappeared from the film industry. After a quiet and long hiatus from the film industry, she co-starred with her brother Win Hlaing in the film Shwe Gaung Pyaung (ရွှေဂေါင်းပြောင်). She also co-stars with actor Tiger Ko Myint in Rupamala. She later remarried, to second husband Zaw Lin and retired from acting. In her last film she co-starred with Moht Moht Myint Aung and Yan Aung in the film Mae Thida Lo Main Galay (မယ်သီတာလို မိန်းကလေး).

Filmography
 Phoo Sar Lan Sone (1969)
 Nu Nu Nge Nge (1970)
 Chit Thu Yway Mal Chit Wae Lal (1975)
 Shwe Gaung Pyaung (1976)

Death 
Sanda died on December 23, 2006 at the age of 58.

References 

2006 deaths
1949 births
Burmese film actresses